RMAS Salmaster (A186) was a Sal-Class mooring and salvage vessel. It came under the Royal Maritime Auxiliary Service department of the Royal Navy, and was sold in 2001.

Built by Hall, Russell & Company in 1986, her displacement is 2,200 tonnes and dimensions 77 m by 15 m by 4 m. Her complement is 19 and speed .

Tasks include the laying and maintenance of underwater targets, navigation marks and moorings.

She now operates for Gardline Shipping, a part of the Gardline group as MV Ocean Endeavour.

References

Royal Maritime Auxiliary Service
1986 ships